The 2015 NASCAR Canadian Tire Series was the ninth season of the NASCAR Canadian Tire Series, which took place in the summer of 2015. The season consisted of 11 races at 10 different venues, of which 7 were held on ovals. It began with the Pinty's presents the Clarington 200 at Canadian Tire Motorsport Park on May 17 and ended with the Pinty's 250 at Kawartha Speedway on September 19. Louis-Philippe Dumoulin entered the season as the defending Drivers' Champion; 2015 was the final season that Canadian Tire sponsored the series, with Pinty's taking over the title sponsorship from 2016.

Scott Steckly won his fourth series championship by four points, holding off an end-of-season points surge by Jason Hathaway. After taking three top-five finishes in the first four races, Steckly won back-to-back events at Edmonton and Saskatoon, before adding a third win at Antigonish and ultimately sealed the championship with second place in the final race. Hathaway won at Chaudière before winning the final two races to close in on Steckly. Andrew Ranger completed the championship top-3, 14 points in arrears of Hathaway. Ranger won one race during the season, winning at Saint-Eustache. Rookie Kevin Lacroix was the only other driver to win more than once; he won two Quebec races at Circuit ICAR and Circuit Trois-Rivières. Gary Klutt (Canadian Tire Motorsport Park) and Alex Tagliani (Sunset Speedway) completed the season's winners, the former taking Rookie of the Year honors ahead of Marc-Antoine Camirand.

Drivers

Schedule
The series' 2015 schedule was released on December 18, 2014. In February 2015, Sunset Speedway was added to the schedule to replace Barrie Speedway, after circuit owners halted racing at the track.

Results and standings

Races

Drivers' championship

(key) Bold - Pole position awarded by time. Italics - Pole position set by final practice results or rainout. * – Most laps led.

Notes
1 – Alex Labbé and Ray Courtemanche Jr. received championship points, despite the fact that they did not start the race.
2 – Paul Jean qualified in the No. 00 for Derek White.

See also

2015 NASCAR Sprint Cup Series
2015 NASCAR Xfinity Series
2015 NASCAR Camping World Truck Series
2015 NASCAR K&N Pro Series East
2015 NASCAR K&N Pro Series West
2015 NASCAR Whelen Modified Tour
2015 NASCAR Whelen Southern Modified Tour
2015 NASCAR Mexico Series
2015 NASCAR Whelen Euro Series

References

External links

Canadian Tire Series Standings and Statistics for 2015

NASCAR Pinty's Series

NASCAR Canadian Tire Series